Caramoan, officially the Municipality of Caramoan, is a 2nd class municipality in the province of Camarines Sur, Philippines. According to the 2020 census, it has a population of 51,728 people.

The municipality is located at the tip of the Caramoan Peninsula, a rugged place of land extending into the waters of the Maqueda Channel on the north and east and Lagonoy Gulf on the south. It has been dubbed as the Emerging Paradise of the Pacific due to its white and pink sand beaches known internationally.

History

The name Caramoan has been officially used since 1619, the year it was named by a Spanish missionary friar, Francisco de la Cruz Y Oropesa. Fr. Oropesa penetrated the thick virgin forest of the Caramoan Peninsula and founded a small settlement in a place called Baluarte. This settlement was subsequently turned over to the administration of the Holy Bishopric in 1696.

Prior to the arrival of the Spaniards, it was determined that the place was once called Guta de Leche, which was given by Dutch traders who operated a gold mine in Lahuy Island and who frequented the area to trade with the natives. The name was perhaps derived from the milkdrop stalagmites found among the rocks of Guta Port. Upon the arrival of the Spaniards, the place came to be called "Carahan" for the sea turtle, which was at that time to be found in great number along the shores of the Peninsula.

Geography
Caramoan is bounded on the north by the town of Garchitorena formerly town of Caramoan and the Philippine Sea of the Pacific Ocean; on the north-east by the island province of Catanduanes; on the south by Lagonoy Gulf; on the east by the Maqueda Channel and on the west by the municipality of Presentacion.

Caramoan Islands
Off the coast of the peninsula are numerous small islets. The 10 principal islands of the group are:

Barangays
Caramoan is politically subdivided into 49 barangays.

Climate

Demographics

Economy

Tourism

Tourist destinations include the Caramoan National Park, the Centro, and Gota Beach, where activities include diving, swimming, snorkeling and spelunking.

Survivor series 
Caramoan has been the site for several editions of the competitive reality television show Survivor. The area has hosted the U.S. version in two consecutive seasons (Survivor: Philippines and Survivor: Caramoan), the Serbian version for two consecutive seasons and the Israeli version for three consecutive seasons (** Survivor: The Philippines, Survivor: Fans vs. Survivors, Survivor: Camarines). Bulgarian Survivor also filmed its fourth season there in May to July 2009. Robinson 2010, the 12th season of the Swedish version of the franchise, was filmed in Caramoan from May to June 2010. Finnish versions were filmed in there in 2018 with all-celebrity cast, and in 2019 half-famous and half- regular people cast.

The 8th season of Koh-Lanta, the French edition of Survivor, also was shot there. TV director Corinne Vaillant stated that "the powdery sand, the coconuts on Gota beach and the neighboring islets are a 'dream' for the French people. We chose Caramoan because it’s really wild. It’s necessary that contestants don’t see anything other than nature for them to believe that they’re really lost in the wilds.”

The only season of Survivor India was shot in Caramoan, with an Indian production crew spotted in the area in March 2011.

The first season of Supraviețuitorul, a Romanian reality game based on Survivor was shot in Caramoan in the summer of 2016, as well as the first and second season of Robinsonův ostrov (Czech version).

In spring of 2016 the first season of the Slovenian version of Survivor Philippines was filmed on 4 different islands, including Catanaguan and Tayak.

References

External links

 [ Philippine Standard Geographic Code]
Philippine Census Information
Official Site of the Province of Camarines Sur

Municipalities of Camarines Sur